Stanwell Park Claystone is a geologic formation in the Sydney Basin in eastern Australia. Commonly seen in the Illawarra region, this stratum is up to 79 metres thick. Formed in the early Triassic, it is part of the Narrabeen Group of sedimentary rocks.This formation includes red, green and grey shale with quartz-lithic sandstone.

See also 
 Sydney Basin
 Scarborough Sandstone
 Garie Formation
 Narrabeen group

References 

Geologic formations of Australia
Triassic Australia
Sandstone formations
Geology of New South Wales